The col de Soladier is a mountain pass in the canton de Vaud, in Switzerland. It is located 1 km west of a ridge linking the Vanil des Artses and the Cape au Moine, and east of Le Molard.

Toponymy 
In vaudois dialect, its name is sor la diez, which means : on the spring.

Activities 

The col de Soladier is a popular destination for hiking, mountain biking, snowshoeing and ski touring. It is possible to reach the col de Jaman by using a small mountain trail.

See also
 Col de Jaman
 Cape au Moine

References

Mountain passes of the canton of Vaud
Mountain passes of the Alps